Dark Wings of Steel is the tenth full-length studio album by Italian symphonic power metal band Rhapsody of Fire. It was released on November 22, 2013, in Europe and December 3, 2013, in the United States via AFM Records. Following the various line-up changes since the previous album From Chaos to Eternity in 2011, Dark Wings of Steel is the first album by the band to not feature guitarist and founding member Luca Turilli, the first with guitarist Roberto De Micheli, and the only album with bassist Oliver Holzwarth.

Background 
Due to Turilli writing the lyrics and co-composing the songs with keyboardist Alex Staropoli in the previous albums, the lyrics are written by singer Fabio Lione, with Staropoli now composing the music with his brother Manuel. Following the departure of other guitarist Tom Hess earlier in the year, the album also marks the return to one full-time guitarist only.

Alex Staropoli stated: "Fabio from now on will be in charge of writing the lyrics and I think this is really important for a singer to be able to write and sing its own lyrics". He also noted about his brother Manuel: "I knew my brother had lots of talent and he proved himself by submitting me with many great songs, which some of them I had to arrange and to use. I am so proud of him and there is a lot more to come".

Track listing

Personnel 
Credits for Dark Wings of Steel adapted from liner notes.

Rhapsody of Fire
 Fabio Lione – lead vocals
 Roberto De Micheli – guitars
 Oliver Holzwarth – bass
 Alex Staropoli – keyboards, production, engineering, editing, cover and booklet concept
 Alex Holzwarth – drums

Additional musicians
 Manuel Staropoli – baroque flute, baroque oboe, recorder, duduk
 Macedonian Radio Symphonic Orchestra – orchestra
 Vito Lo Ré – orchestra and choir conductor, scoring

Choir
 Hao Wang, Matjaž Zobec, Noémi Boros, Paola Marra

Production
 Sebastian Roeder – engineering, mixing, editing
 Giorgi Hristovski – engineering
 Boban Apostolov – engineering
 Alberto Bravin – engineering, editing
 Christoph Stickel – mastering
 Luca Balbo – choir contractor
 Severin Schweiger – photography
 Karsten vom Wege – logo
 Felipe Machado Franco – cover art, layout, cover concept

Charts

References 

2013 albums
AFM Records albums
Rhapsody of Fire albums